Mathias Evert Johansson (born February 22, 1974) is a Swedish former professional ice hockey forward.

Career
Johansson represented Sweden in the 2002 Winter Olympics in Salt Lake City, United States. He has also represented Sweden in the Ice Hockey World Championship three times (2001, 2002 and 2003). He has played one season (2002/03) in the NHL, during which he played 46 games with the Calgary Flames and 12 games the Pittsburgh Penguins. During the rest of his career he has played with the Swedish team Färjestads BK but in April 2008 he was forced to leave the club, after a bad season, Färjestad did not offered him a new contract. In May 2008 he signed a three-year contract with Allsvenskan side Malmö Redhawks.

Career statistics

International play

Played for Sweden in:
1991 European Junior Championships (4th place)
1992 European Junior Championships (silver medal)
1994 World Junior Ice Hockey Championships (silver medal)
2001 Ice Hockey World Championships (bronze medal)
2002 Winter Olympics (5th place)
2002 Ice Hockey World Championships (bronze medal)
2003 Ice Hockey World Championships (silver medal)
2006 Ice Hockey World Championships (gold medal)

Awards and titles
 1997, 1998, 2002 and 2006: winner of the Elitserien with Färjestads BK

References

External links

1974 births
Calgary Flames draft picks
Calgary Flames players
Färjestad BK players
Ice hockey players at the 2002 Winter Olympics
Leksands IF players
Living people
Malmö Redhawks players
Olympic ice hockey players of Sweden
People from Oskarshamn Municipality
Pittsburgh Penguins players
Ritten Sport players
Swedish ice hockey centres
Sportspeople from Kalmar County